Umakant Rajak is an Indian politician and member of the All Jharkhand Students Union. Umakant Rajak is a member of the Jharkhand Legislative Assembly from the Chandankiyari constituency in Bokaro district.

References 

People from Bokaro district
All Jharkhand Students Union politicians
Members of the Jharkhand Legislative Assembly
Living people
21st-century Indian politicians
Year of birth missing (living people)